Macraspis lucida is a species of beetles of the family Scarabaeidae. It occurs in Guatemala and Mexico.

References

External links
 Galerie-insecte

Scarabaeidae
Beetles described in 1789